The 2023 Euroformula Open Championship is a planned multi-event motor racing championship for single-seater open wheel formula racing cars held across Europe. The championship will features drivers competing in Euroformula Open Championship specification Dallara 320 chassis cars. It will be the tenth Euroformula Open Championship season.

The season is scheduled to consist of eight race weekends, starting in late April and spanning until October.

Teams and drivers 
All teams will utilize the Dallara 320 chassis. The 2023 season was scheduled to see a body kit upgrade for the chassis as well as the introduction of larger 17-inch tyres, but these plans were later scrapped. The tyre supplier will change from Michelin to Hankook.

Race calendar 
A provisional eight-round calendar was announced at the penultimate round of the 2022 championship, on 22 September 2022. This planned schedule saw the rounds at Imola, Estoril and the Pau Grand Prix leaving the calendar, with rounds at Algarve and Mugello added instead. The calendar was updated on 24 January 2023, with the Pau Grand Prix reintroduced to the schedule. The 80th edition of the Grand Prix replaced the round at Mugello.

References

External links 

 

Euroformula Open Championship seasons
Euroformula Open
Euroformula Open
Euroformula Open